The Harvey Hotel in Gallup, New Mexico, at 408 W. Coal Ave., was built in 1928.  It was listed on the National Register of Historic Places in 1988.

It is a two-story building with a Decorative Brick Commercial style facade and "Stone Commercial Style" walls.  It competed with the Grand Hotel located one block to the east.

It was never associated with the hotel line of the Fred Harvey Company.

References

Hotels in New Mexico
National Register of Historic Places in McKinley County, New Mexico
Hotel buildings completed in 1928